Bighorn Airways is an American charter company based in Sheridan, Wyoming, United States. It operates domestic charter passenger and cargo services, including contract services. Its main base is Sheridan County Airport.

History 
The company was established and started operations in 1947. It is owned by Robert and Christopher Eisele.

Fleet 
The Bighorn Airways fleet consists of the following aircraft (as of August 2021): 
5 CASA C-212-200 Aviocar
5 Dornier 228-202
3 Bombardier DHC-8-106
2 Cessna 340
2 Air Tractor 402
2 Bell 206 Jet Ranger
1 Cessna CitationJet
1 Cessna 172M Skyhawk
1 Cessna 180
1 Hiller 12E
1 Piper PA-18 Supercub
1 Beechcraft King Air 350

References

External links
 

Charter airlines of the United States
Airlines established in 1947
Airlines based in Wyoming
Transportation in Sheridan County, Wyoming
1947 establishments in Wyoming
Privately held companies based in Wyoming